Should a Doctor Tell? may refer to:

 Should a Doctor Tell? (1930 film), a 1930 British drama film
 Should a Doctor Tell? (1923 film), a 1923 Australian silent film